Delbert McClinton (born November 4, 1940) is an American blues rock and electric blues singer-songwriter, guitarist, harmonica player, and pianist.

From his first professional stage appearance in 1957  to his most recent national tour in 2018, he has recorded albums for several major record labels and singles that have reached the U.S.  Billboard Hot 100, Mainstream Rock Tracks, and Hot Country Songs charts. His highest-charting single was "Tell Me About It", a 1992 duet with Tanya Tucker, which reached number 4 on the Country chart. Four of his albums have been number 1 on the Blues chart, and another reached number 2. His highest charting pop hit was 1980's "Giving It Up for Your Love," which peaked at number 8 on the Hot 100.

McClinton has earned four Grammy Awards; 1992 Rock Performance by a Duo with Bonnie Raitt for "Good Man, Good Woman"; 2002 Contemporary Blues Album for Nothing Personal; 2006 Best Contemporary Blues Album for Cost of Living, and 2020 Best Traditional Blues Album for Tall, Dark, & Handsome. He has been nominated for eight Grammy Awards as of 2020.

He was inducted into the Texas Heritage Songwriters Hall of Fame in March 2011, along with Lee Roy Parnell, Bruce Channel, Gary Nicholson, and Cindy Walker. In 2019, Delbert McClinton was honored by the historic Paramount Theatre in Austin, Texas with the fifth star in their Walk of Fame. (Others are actors Jaston Williams and Joe Sears, and musical artists Jerry Jeff Walker and Lyle Lovett).

Career

Early years
McClinton was born in Lubbock, Texas, and relocated with his family to Fort Worth, Texas, when he was 11 years old. He worked in a bar band, the Straitjackets, who played backing Sonny Boy Williamson II, Howlin' Wolf, Lightnin' Hopkins, and Jimmy Reed. McClinton recorded several regional singles before hitting the national chart in 1962, playing harmonica on Bruce Channel's "Hey! Baby". On a tour with Channel in the United Kingdom, McClinton instructed John Lennon on the finer points of blues harmonica playing.

McClinton formed the Ron-Dels, sometimes called the Rondells, with Ronnie Kelly and Billy Wade Sanders. The band had a chart single in 1965 with "If You Really Want Me To I'll Go."

1970s
Relocating to Los Angeles in 1972, McClinton partnered with fellow Texan Glen Clark to perform a combination of country and soul music. They achieved a degree of artistic success, releasing two albums before splitting and McClinton embarked on a solo career.

Emmylou Harris had a number 1 hit in 1978 with her recording of McClinton's composition "Two More Bottles of Wine," and a cover version of his "B Movie Boxcar Blues" was on the first album by the Blues Brothers, Briefcase Full of Blues.

1980s and 1990s
McClinton's 1980 album, The Jealous Kind, contained his only Top 40 hit single, "Giving It Up for Your Love", which peaked at number 8 on the Billboard Hot 100 and number 35 Adult Contemporary. He was inactive in the studio during much of the 1980s, though toured heavily. McClinton closed the decade with the Grammy-nominated 1989 album Live from Austin, recorded during an appearance on the television program Austin City Limits and co-produced by sax sideman Don Wise, who went on to become a longtime fixture in the band.

In 1991 McClinton won a Grammy Award for a duet with Bonnie Raitt, "Good Man, Good Woman", and reached the Top 5 of the Country chart with "Tell Me About It", a duet with Tanya Tucker. He re-entered the Billboard charts in 1992 with the album Never Been Rocked Enough, which included the charting single "Every Time I Roll the Dice" and a cover of John Hiatt's "Have a Little Faith in Me."

McClinton recorded the song "Weatherman", which was played with the opening titles of the 1993 film Groundhog Day, starring Bill Murray. The fledgling label Rising Tide Records released One of the Fortunate Few in 1997, before the label went out of business.

2000–present
McClinton released two studio albums in the early 2000s for New West Records, which also issued Delbert McClinton Live in 2003, a compilation album of songs from his career. In 2006, he won a Grammy Award for his album The Cost of Living in the category Best Contemporary Blues Album.

Etta James included two McClinton songs on her 2003 album, Let's Roll.

McClinton was a judge for the fourth annual Independent Music Awards, presented to independent artists to support their careers.

He is featured in the documentary film Rocking the Boat: A Musical Conversation and Journey, by the filmmaker Jay Curlee.

McClinton performed on the Frankie Miller album Double Take, released in 2016; his voice is merged with Miller's in the song "Beginner at the Blues".

His 2019 recording, Tall, Dark & Handsome, was chosen as a 'Favorite Blues Album' by AllMusic. It was awarded the 2020 Grammy Award for Best Traditional Blues Album.

Discography

Studio albums

Compilation albums

Singles

Guest singles

Music videos

References

External links
Official website
AllMusic biography

1940 births
American blues singers
American country singer-songwriters
American blues harmonica players
American blues pianists
American male pianists
Grammy Award winners
Living people
People from Lubbock, Texas
Charay Records artists
New West Records artists
Curb Records artists
Rising Tide Records artists
American blues guitarists
American male guitarists
Singer-songwriters from Texas
Guitarists from Texas
20th-century American guitarists
20th-century American pianists
Country musicians from Texas
21st-century American pianists
20th-century American male musicians
21st-century American male musicians
Alligator Records artists
American male singer-songwriters